Savatage was an American heavy metal band founded by brothers Jon and Criss Oliva in 1979 in Tarpon Springs, Florida. The band was first called Avatar, but, shortly before the release of their debut album Sirens (1983), they changed their name to Savatage, as Avatar was already taken by another band. Savatage is considered a significant member of the American heavy metal movement of the early-to-mid-1980s and has been cited as a key influence on many genres, such as power metal, progressive metal, speed metal, thrash metal, death metal and symphonic metal.

Savatage has released eleven studio albums, two live albums, four compilations and three EPs. The band first reached substantial commercial success with its third studio album Fight for the Rock (1986), which peaked at number 158 on the Billboard 200. Its next four albums—Hall of the Mountain King (1987), Gutter Ballet (1989), Streets: A Rock Opera (1991) and Edge of Thorns (1993)—were also successful but more critically acclaimed than Fight for the Rock. On October 17, 1993, six months after the release of Edge of Thorns, guitarist Criss Oliva was killed in a car accident. Following his death, Jon (along with producer Paul O'Neill) decided to continue Savatage in memory of his brother. The band released four more studio albums, and went through several line-up changes before going on an extended hiatus in 2002. During the years—partly even before the hiatus—members founded various new bands such as Jon Oliva's Pain, Trans-Siberian Orchestra, Circle II Circle and Doctor Butcher. On August 2, 2014, Savatage announced that they were reuniting for the 2015 Wacken Open Air; despite having discussed the possibility of more shows and new music, the band went on hiatus once again. Although Savatage technically remains inactive, half of the members of the band claimed in interviews during throughout 2020 and 2021 that they have been working on new material for a possible follow-up to Poets and Madmen (2001).

History

Early days (1979–1986) 
Criss Oliva and his brother Jon formed their first band together, Avatar, in 1979, from the ashes of their former bands Tower and Alien respectively. In 1980, the duo met up with Steve "Doc" Wacholz and practiced in a small shack behind the Oliva home that was dubbed "The Pit" by the band. Wacholz originally tried out to be part of Jon's band, Alien, but when the first Savatage line-up was taking shape, Jon, who was originally on drum duties, was relieved of them by Wacholz. They also gave Steve a nickname that would follow him throughout his career: "Doctor Hardware Killdrums", often shortened to just "Doc" or "Doc Killdrums", which referred to Steve's hard playing style.

Criss, Jon and Steve played Tampa (where they had moved with their family in the late 1970s) and Clearwater area clubs for many years. In 1981, Ronald Leon Sisson joined them to relieve Jon of bass guitar duties. In late 2006, footage was released onto the internet of an early performance by Avatar at a gig in a Clearwater, Florida parking lot and was prominent in featuring an early version of the song "Holocaust", which would later be released on Savatage's first album and a cover of Van Halen's "Eruption" and VH's version of "You Really Got Me". In 1982, Avatar took part in some heavy metal compilations, most notably "The YNF Pirate Tape", a promotion by Tampa rock radio station 95ynf for local Florida bands. Shortly after its release, "Avatar" was forced to change its name due to copyright issues. Combining the words "Savage" and "Avatar", the band decided on Savatage.

Their first album, Sirens and the following EP The Dungeons Are Calling, were released on Par Records, an independent label. In 1984, they signed a contract with Atlantic Records and released their second full-length album Power of the Night in May of the following year. Power of the Night, which was produced by Max Norman, who would go on to produce Megadeth's 1992 album Countdown to Extinction, showcased the band's unorthodox approach to metal, which included Jon's liberal use of keyboards on songs like "Fountain of Youth" and Broadway-style song structures like the kind employed on "Warriors". It was well received by critics but fell short of sales expectations. Atlantic budgeted to provide funds to make a video for "Hard for Love", on the condition that it be retitled "Hot for Love" for broadcast purposes. The band refused to change the song and consequently a video was not released. In promotion of Power of the Night, Savatage embarked on the Monsters of the Universe Tour with Rogue Male and Illusion, and also played with Mötley Crüe, Quiet Riot, Exodus, Raven, Overkill and Armored Saint.

In 1986, after the release of their third album, Fight for the Rock, a failed attempt at a commercial approach imposed by the record company which the band themselves called Fight for the Nightmare, Savatage toured with Metallica, KISS and Motörhead. The band were not happy with the record, with pressure from the label to include two cover versions. Jon Oliva had been retained to write material for other artists on the Atlantic label, such as John Waite and other pop-rockers. Later, the label demanded Savatage record the material themselves. In a choice they would later regret, the band agreed. Not only did it destroy them in the press, it nearly destroyed the band and sent Jon into his early alcohol and drug problems. Jon recently admitted however the album did have strong points, including the band's cover of Badfinger's "Day After Day". During this time, original bassist Keith Collins left the band, and Johnny Lee Middleton joined the band. Since 1987, Johnny has been the only consistent member of Savatage, performing on every album (except Handful of Rain).

Rise to popularity and death of Criss Oliva (1987–1993) 
In 1987, Savatage released their first commercially successful album, Hall of the Mountain King, which became the base for the band rising into a more mainstream arena. The band recorded their first music video for the album's title song, which received extensive air play on MTV's Headbangers Ball and was followed up by a video for the song "24 Hours Ago". A world tour in support of the album in 1987-1988 followed, playing with a variety of bands like Dio, Megadeth, Iron Maiden, Testament, Sanctuary, Pandemonium, Nuclear Assault, Heathen, Forbidden, and Helstar. Hall of the Mountain King not only found a new audience for Savatage, but also introduced a new musical style, featuring symphonic elements, strongly influenced by their new producer, Paul O'Neill, that would shape the band's future recordings. O'Neill contributed most of the lyrics for the rest of their career and gave them a more conceptual edge starting with their next album, Gutter Ballet.

Gutter Ballet, which was released in 1989, has been considered the band's true turning point. This album saw the band adopt a more progressive style, writing longer songs with more complex melodies and differing vocal styles, rather than the more straightforward power metal style that was apparent in earlier works. The change to a more progressive, operatic style was also precipitated by Jon, after seeing a performance of Phantom of the Opera in Toronto. The songs "Gutter Ballet" and "When the Crowds Are Gone" are examples of this influence from that album, as was the next Savatage's release (which even included "Opera" in its title). Many additional songs already written, before the decision of this change of style, were unused and subsequently published as bonus tracks, in the Sirens and The Dungeons Are Calling 2002 reissues, some of them were also re-worked and published by Jon Oliva's Pain. Gutter Ballet proved to be another success for Savatage, with the title track and "When the Crowds Are Gone" receiving considerable airplay on Headbangers Ball and album-oriented radio stations. The album was once again supported by a grueling tour, which took place in much of 1990, touring North America with Testament and Nuclear Assault, and Europe with King Diamond and Candlemass. They also toured the US with Trouble.

Chris Caffery, who had been playing with Savatage in the previous tour performing rhythm guitar and keyboards offstage, officially joined the band in 1989. He never played on the Gutter Ballet album, even though he was credited with guitars and keyboards and was pictured in the album's booklet "both to prepare the fans for the line-up they'd see on tour and confirm his permanent member status". Despite this, Caffery left the band after the Gutter Ballet tour for personal reasons, but kept writing music with Jon Oliva and would later return to Savatage during the second half of the 1990s.

In 1991, the band created their first rock opera Streets, featuring the story of a fallen rock star called DT Jesus who has hit hard times. The record did not sell as well as the band would have liked however, as it was released around the time that grunge exploded into the mainstream music arena, but a video for "Jesus Saves" was recorded and again got airplay, drawing a new audience to appreciate the band. Over the years Streets: A Rock Opera has become one of the most appreciated and a landmark album in Savatage's career. Originally, this record was intended to be a double album, but Atlantic Records did not like the idea, so it was trimmed down to 17 songs. The album was then going to have spoken tracks in-between all the songs but that was scrapped also. The final version scrapped the 17th song "Larry Elbows" and erased all the spoken tracks except for the intro to Jesus Saves. The cover had the story explained in it to make up for the lost spoken tracks. Atlantic somehow over the years managed to lose the master tapes to Streets so the left over songs truly are lost. Many of the riffs from these songs showed up on the next album Edge of Thorns. Another interesting detail about the album is that "Jesus Saves" was originally written as a midtempo song, not the rocker it became on the finished album. In 2013, a narrated version of the album was re-issued with the title: Streets: A Rock Opera - Narrated Version.

The world tour in support of Streets began in October 1991 in Europe, with support from Vicious Rumors. The next several months were spent touring relentlessly in North America, with the likes of Armored Saint and Fates Warning, followed by their first shows in Japan. After the Streets tour ended in the spring of 1992, Jon Oliva left the band to concentrate on his side projects Doctor Butcher and his Broadway-bound musical Romanov, as well as continuing co-writing Savatage material with his brother Criss and producer Paul O'Neill. However, as of 2013, only one instrumental track from the Romanov project was released under the moniker Trans-Siberian Orchestra on the Dreams of Fireflies EP. After this EP, together with a Broadway version of Streets named Gutter Ballet (including mainly songs from both these albums), even Romanov is planned as a future Trans-Siberian Orchestra album.

On June 13, 1992, during the Jon's Farewell Show at Rock-It Club in Tampa, 28 songs were played to cover all the main highlights of the band. This show was not intended, recorded or filmed for any sort of live album.

The new lead vocalist, former Wicked Witch singer Zachary Stevens, was discovered and introduced to the band by Criss's best friend and guitar technician Dan Campbell. The band recorded their follow-up to Streets, Edge of Thorns, in 1993. Drummer Steve Wacholz decided to record the album but he was not interested in touring, even though he stated he intended to return to the band in the future, and hand-picked his replacement as well in drummer Andy James. For the first time, Savatage began to enjoy mainstream recognition, including increased radio play and a world tour which gained international press as "the best Savatage has ever sounded live". However, tragedy struck when founder and lead guitarist Criss Oliva was killed by a drunk driver on October 17, 1993. Jon chose to continue the band, although he has since admitted that the band was pretty much over after Criss's death, but only kept going because of his memory and to "keep his music alive".

After Criss and second era of the band (1994–2000) 
A short while after Criss' death, the band held a tribute show for the late guitarist, with the same line-up as the Streets tour but without Criss. Lead guitarist Alex Skolnick temporarily joined Savatage in 1994 for the release of their ninth album Handful of Rain, written by Jon Oliva and Paul O'Neill. Although the album is technically a Jon Oliva solo album, with Jon handling all instrumental duties except for vocals by Zachary Stevens and lead guitars by Alex Skolnick, the record was released under the Savatage moniker with bass and drum credits given to Middleton and Wacholz respectively, as drummer Andy James had left the band following the death of Criss Oliva to pursue other projects. The song "Chance" was the first Savatage song to contain the usage of counterpoint vocals, a style which they continued to use on following albums. The album's final track, "Alone You Breathe", was a tribute to Criss Oliva.

When the band were preparing to tour in support of Handful of Rain, drummer Steve Wacholz announced his official departure from the band. Jeff Plate, a former bandmember of Zak Stevens' old band, was hired to replace him. Jon Oliva agreed to do the tour to perform keyboards and rhythm guitar, and a live CD/VHS entitled Japan Live '94 (in later releases it has been retitled Live in Japan) was released at the conclusion of the very short tour with Skolnick's three-piece band Exhibit-A and power metal band Tempo Tantrum as supporting-acts. After this tour, Alex Skolnick left the band to pursue other interests. In a 2011 interview, Skolnick had this to say about his time with Savatage:

While Skolnick adapted Criss Oliva's solos to his own style, former guitarist Chris Caffery, who had left after the Gutter Ballet tour, was convinced he could do them better. He then told Jon Oliva that he would rejoin the band to pay tribute to his friend and mentor Criss Oliva on the condition that he would play all of Criss' solos, which the band accepted. Atlantic Records, however, wanted a second, more well-known guitarist to join the band, and Al Pitrelli was chosen. Pitrelli was known for his previous work with Alice Cooper and Asia, among others, and would play the majority of the lead parts of the band's new material.

In 1995, Savatage released their second rock opera Dead Winter Dead, an even more ambitious undertaking than its predecessor, Streets. They also achieved cross-over success with "Christmas Eve Sarajevo 12/24", which received heavy rotation on multiple radio formats during the Christmas season. While they toured Europe and Japan, the group forwent an American tour to work on their new project, Christmas Eve and Other Stories, recorded by the Trans-Siberian Orchestra (TSO), comprising Savatage and a large orchestra. Jon Oliva has since admitted that he was annoyed to see the success of TSO with what was originally a Savatage song, leading him to believe that the biggest barrier to success as Savatage was the name.

Also in 1995, another live album Ghost in the Ruins – A Tribute to Criss Oliva was published with old recordings taken during the Gutter Ballet tour. This release is titled Final Bell in Japan and Ghost in the Ruins elsewhere. Ghost in the Ruins was one of the titles the band previously considered for the album Streets.

The eleventh studio album, The Wake of Magellan, was released in 1997 after a break to deal with the huge success of TSO, and dealt with such concepts as the worth of a life, suicide and drug abuse, drawing on real-life events such as the Maersk Dubai and the murder of Veronica Guerin. Savatage parted ways with long-time label Atlantic after this release and eventually signed on with a much smaller organization, Nuclear Blast (although Trans-Siberian Orchestra albums would in the future remain on the Atlantic/Lava imprint). Jon Oliva said that this was a good move, as Nuclear Blast "loved the band and they know our songs and everything!".

Due to Jon, O'Neill and Savatage's long time engineer Robert Kinkel's songwriting, the main differences between Savatage's last two albums and Trans-Siberian Orchestra are the usage of a real orchestra and the fact lead vocals are not played only by Oliva and/or Zachary Stevens, as in Savatage, but by a huge number of guest singers.

Hiatus and side projects (2001–2013) 

Savatage continued to focus on their Trans-Siberian Orchestra project for a while, releasing The Christmas Attic, but the release of Poets and Madmen in 2001 was highlighted by Jon Oliva's return as lead vocalist in studio, replacing Zak Stevens, who left the band citing family reasons, and the departure of Al Pitrelli, who accepted an offer to join Megadeth in 2000. Pitrelli did record solos for some songs prior to his departure. Another very limited US tour followed, supported by Fates Warning in the early shows, and then Nevermore for the remainder. Around this time, Caffery chose Zak's replacement in the form of the singer Damond Jiniya (Diet of Worms), who was once again brought to the band from long-time friend and Circle II Circle manager/co founder Dan Campbell. Damond sang the song "Edge of Thorns" as his audition song. Damond performed Zak's parts on tour, with Jon having an increased vocal role in proceedings. Jack Frost auditioned for the role of rhythm guitar player, and got the gig. He played with the band for a majority of the tour, but was mysteriously asked to leave the band after the tour, although it could be said that Frost's commitments elsewhere drove him from the band. For Summer festival appearances in 2002, the band was joined by Annihilator's Jeff Waters.

Savatage have remained inactive since that tour, with band members concentrating on other projects such as Trans-Siberian Orchestra and Jon Oliva's Pain. This has not pleased everyone, with Chris Caffery in particular citing his anger at Savatage  not recording a new album in almost five years .

Trans-Siberian Orchestra continues with their releases and Savatage's members are mostly split up between its two touring line-ups, but during the European tours in 2011 and 2014 Pitrelli, Caffery, Middleton and Plate were all featured together on stage. Year by year more Savatage songs were included in the TSO setlists, among them also Gutter Ballet, Believe, All That I Bleed and Chance.
Jon Oliva usually doesn't play on stage with Trans-Siberian Orchestra while Paul O'Neill, in recent years, started to do it very often during some selected songs.
 
Jon Oliva formed his own band, Jon Oliva's Pain, and released their first album in 2004 entitled 'Tage Mahal. Through the years Jon Oliva's Pain, also called JOP, published many records and their live concerts always feature Savatage's songs from the albums with Criss Oliva. Additional material, taken by Jon from his brother's unused stuff, was used to write several Jon Oliva's Pain's tracks as described in the album's credits.

Lead guitarist Chris Caffery also recorded solo albums  while former front man Zak Stevens was approached by long-time friend and Savatage stage manager Dan Campbell to co-found a new band Circle II Circle and their first record entitled Watching in Silence was released in 2003, produced by Jon Oliva and featuring a guest appearance from Caffery. After a dispute with the management during the tour, Zak's entire band left and joined Jon Oliva's Pain band. Zak regrouped with new members and release other new records. Since 2011, the band included more and more Savatage songs (from the records with Stevens at vocals) in their setlists, and in 2012 also the entire The Wake Of Magellan album was played. Their 2013 European tour included the complete Edge Of Thorns album due to its 20th anniversary while the 2014 European tour included the complete Handful of Rain album for the same reason.

In addition to his work with Trans-Siberian Orchestra, drummer Jeff Plate performed with electric violinist Mark Wood and joined Metal Church. He also reformed Wicked Witch with Zak Stevens, renaming the band Machines of Grace, and releasing a self-titled album in 2010.

Never involved with Trans-Siberian Orchestra, Steve Wacholz formed a new band in 2010, named Reverence, with guitarist Pete Rossi, vocalist Todd Michael Hall (formerly of Jack Starr's Burning Starr and currently in Riot V) and former Tokyo Blade members guitarist Bryan Holland and bassist Frank Saparti.

Criss Oliva 10th anniversary memorial concert 
On October 17, 2003, at The Masquerade in historic Ybor City, Tampa, Florida, fans were invited to remember and celebrate the life and contributions of Criss Oliva at a 10th anniversary memorial concert. It featured Circle II Circle, Jon Oliva's Pain and Doctor Butcher as supporting acts and, as headliner, a special one night only band (composed of Jon Oliva, Johnny Lee Middleton, Steve "Doc" Wacholz, Chris Caffery and John Zahner) who played only selected songs from the albums with Criss Oliva. Many Criss parts were executed by Jon himself using keyboards. This show was not intended, recorded or filmed for any sort of live album.

Reunion rumors 
In an interview to Aardschok, a Dutch Magazine, in June 2006, Jon Oliva announced that he wants to record one more Savatage album, with a live CD and DVD to follow it, before ending the band. He did not specify a release date for a new album, however. Chris Caffery then said in an interview in October 2006 that if a new Savatage album was to be recorded, then it's likely that Alex Skolnick would be involved, as well as original drummer Steve "Doc" Wacholz. 
In a November 2006 interview to Greek website, MetalTemple.com, Jon Oliva himself shot down all rumours of the return of Savatage, claiming that it never made him any money, but instead it cost him one million US dollars to keep the band going over the years.

Jon also said that his new band, Jon Oliva's Pain, is basically Savatage reincarnated, so it could co-exist with the more successful Trans-Siberian Orchestra. He did however state that a one-off anniversary tour featuring Skolnick, Wacholz and other past Savatage members is being planned with Paul O'Neill as a final send off to the band. Zachary Stevens has made it clear that he will participate in a 25th anniversary festivities with the band. Jon Oliva then said about the band "Well, it's over but it's not over, you know what I mean? It's over right now because no one's doing anything. We haven't disbanded or anything. We have plans to do something in the future." Jon also announced that he is doing "some video compilation stuff, and editing old things for a bonus DVD to go with it, that has a ton of live Criss stuff in concert, a lot of backstage frolicking about, and going to castles in Europe".

In 2007, Jon denied any rumours of a Savatage reunion and tour, as the Trans-Siberian Orchestra has become a year-round commitment, adding that Jon Oliva's Pain is "as close to Savatage as you can get". Despite Jon's earlier denials, in October 2008 the band launched an official MySpace page, hinting that 2009 would see some activity under the Savatage banner. The line-up listed on official MySpace is: Jon Oliva, Zak Stevens, Chris Caffery, Al Pitrelli, Johnny Lee Middleton and Jeff Plate; signalling that Stevens would return as lead vocalist in a reunion. In December of the same year, a brand new Savatage web site was unveiled. However, Jon Oliva has since denied these reunion rumors saying:

In 2013, in support for Jon's first solo album titled Raise the Curtain, Jon has been giving many interviews, and during at least one he mentioned the possibility of new Savatage music is something he's considering. While discussing the success of TSO and the decision to cease activities as Savatage with Dr. Metal on 6/30/13 he had this to say about the idea of new Savatage recordings:

One-off reunion, death of Paul O'Neill and second hiatus (2014–2019) 
On August 2, 2014, it was announced that Trans-Siberian Orchestra would be performing live on stage at Wacken Open Air 2015, followed immediately by a Savatage reunion gig. It was announced as Savatage's only live show in Europe in 2015, which led to speculation that it would be a one-off reunion show, or the band had planned to continue performing in the future.

Asked in a December 2014 interview if Savatage would do any more live shows or record new material, guitarist Chris Caffery replied, "I'm gonna put it this way: for 12 years, 13 years, I've been waiting for my band to play again. We're playing again. I don't know what's going to happen after that [laughs], but there were people that were putting a fork in it, and we're getting up and not just running a marathon, we're running in the Olympics with this festival being what it is. I'm not going to make any predictions, but let's just say there's a possibility that something more will happen after Wacken—that's all I can say. And nothing would make me happier."

On the future of Savatage, frontman Jon Oliva explained, "As far as that goes, the whole Wacken thing came up, and I was, like, you know what? If we're going to do anything, we have to do it now. I don't want to do it when I'm 60 years old. I mentioned that to Paul. He said to me, 'We're going to do the Wacken thing, but let's just wait until the winter tour is over and then you and me we're going to sit down in January and discuss what we're going to do. Jon also said that Savatage has "already gotten offers" to play in "certain areas of the world, America being one, Greece, South America, places like that", and added that he does not rule out the possibility of any more shows. Though Oliva said he does not know what the future holds for Savatage, he said, "I just wish that everything works out good and then we'll see what happens down the road. I'll never say no to anything anymore, because every time I do, I get rained on."

The Wacken started with a performance of Savatage on the Black Stage, featuring Gutter Ballet as first song. After seven songs the band left the stage, and on the True Metal Stage TSO began to play with Pitrelli and its non-Sava members. Caffery, Middleton and Plate replaced them on several songs, and Stevens had a duet with Andrew Ross in the song "The Hourglass". This set was followed up by simultaneous play by both bands, featuring also Savatage and TSO songs, ending up with O'Neill's appearance on guitar in "Christmas Eve (Sarajevo 12/24)" and "Requiem (The Fifth)".

In October 2015, Zak Stevens confirmed the intentions of starting a new phase for Savatage, adding that (from November 1 on) there would be meetings to take decisions on the details, possibly a tour or a new album, since Jon Oliva is inspiredly writing new music.

When asked in April 2016 about Savatage's future, drummer Jeff Plate (who had recently released an album with Metal Church) stated, "This really is a question for Jon and Paul. We had a tremendous time last year when we performed at the Wacken Open Air Festival. It truly was great, and magical, to perform with that band again. I would love to put the Dead Winter Dead band back on the road again, but this is not my decision to be made."
 
In April 2017, it was announced that Savatage producer, lyricist and co-composer Paul O'Neill had died at the age of 61.

When asked in August 2017 about a possible reunion with a classic Savatage lineup (with Chris Caffery filling in for the late Criss Oliva on guitar), original drummer Steve "Doc" Wacholz mentioned a Savatage tour taking place in 2018. However, he stated, "I really can't imagine them having TWO drummers on stage, so Jeff will be doing the drumming duties on his own (which he does a great job), although I would love to finish what I started with the Olivas so long ago. That would be a great accomplishment, but I do not see it happening."

In a September 2018 interview with Bill Louis of WNCX radio, Plate stated that he would "really love to see" a Savatage reunion, but added that O'Neill's death and the success of Trans-Siberian Orchestra were the reasons the band has been sidelined since their 2015 reunion show at Wacken Open Air. He explained, "There's always been that thought. We did get back together for the Wacken show in 2015. There was a lot of talk after that show, because it was very well-received. When the band got back together, it's just so interesting how when a certain group of guys get together and play music, it's just different than plugging other people in. There's a real chemistry there with the six of us — Jon Oliva, Chris Caffery, Johnny Middleton, Al Pitrelli, myself and Zak Stevens. Of course, there's always interest, but when we lost Paul, it had to get pushed aside. There's always conversations, and personally, I would really love to see it. We would love to make that happen, but with everything that's happened over the past couple of years, there's a lot going on there. Once all the business end of this whole scenario gets sorted out here and we all get in a room and really talk about some things... It's going to take a little time — none of this stuff is easy — but I would love to see it happen. I know a lot of people would, and I know a number of guys in the band would really like to see it happen too. But Trans-Siberian Orchestra, that's the focus — that has been our success, and this is what our careers have become. If we can somehow squeeze some Savatage music or some shows in there around all this, that would be fantastic."

When asked in December 2019 about the current state of Savatage, Stevens said: "You've always got Savatage lurking out there that we really don't know for sure either. Basically the same answer that I get from them is what I'm giving for Circle II Circle — 'You know what? It's not ever gone, but we just have to figure out what [to do], and the answer will come.' When the right situation appears, that's when I think things will happen... It needs the right thing to come along. I like the fact that TSO has five Savatage songs in the last half of the set this year, so something's brewing... I don't really have any more answers after that, but something seems like it's going on. We're going to find out one way or the other at some point, but the right situation has to come along, I think."

Recent events and possible second reunion (2020–present) 
In November 2020, when commenting on the possibility of a full-time reunion of Savatage, guitarist Al Pitrelli revealed that Jon Oliva "is always working on new music, constantly sending [him] new songs and new ideas", and added, "We always talk about doing something, I would like more than ever to get the band back together and back on tour." Pitrelli also stated that there has not yet been any discussion of a tour with the agents or promoters, and concluded, "What I do know is that we all talk about it often, particularly now that we have a lot of time to talk. The conversation is still open, I spoke to Chris Caffery...Jeff Plate, Johnny Lee, we all talk about it all the time, it's just a matter of saying, 'Okay, let's leave this pandemic behind and focus on the important things in life!'"

In December 2020 interview with Brave Words, guitarist Chris Caffery hinted at Savatage releasing a new album in 2022. When asked about the possibility of the band carrying on without their late friend and producer Paul O'Neill, he said, "I mean we've been speaking about it for the last 20 years now, since the last record. It's always able to happen and something else stops it - you've got Haley's Comet coming around once in a while, and every hundred years you have a pandemic, and once every 20 years there's a Savatage record. It will be 20 years in 2022 so maybe that's when it will show up. I'm kind of hopeful that it does, I know I've done a lot of writing, and Jon has, and Al always has a lot of music, so we could make a record. Things would never be exactly the same without Paul, but they were never exactly the same without Criss Oliva either, but we still managed to do Dead Winter Dead and Wake of Magellan and Poets and Madmen." Caffrey also offered an update on the state of Jon Oliva's health, saying, "He's doing much better, because a couple of years ago he had a bit of an incident. So he hit a bump in the road with something inside of him. I see the masked mountain king every day and probably the last four five years he's looked the best he has to me."

In February 2021, Savatage announced that their first album Sirens and the EP The Dungeons Are Calling were released to streaming platforms in the US for the first time. In a statement issued by the band, they wrote, "This is just the start of many new exciting things we have in store for you this year"; this had led to speculation that there would be Savatage-related activities in 2021.

After months of rumors that a reunion and new album from Savatage were planned, vocalist Jon Oliva confirmed in a March 2021 interview with "80's Glam Metalcast" that he, Caffery and Pitrelli had indeed been working on new material together: "Since [Savatage's] Wacken [reunion] show in 2015, Chris Caffery, me and Al Pitrelli, we've been trading song ideas for a possible Savatage thing over the phone. I go, 'Hey, this is great. This is great. This is cool.' But I've been writing Savatage material since 2003, and I could do a quadruple double album, if I wanted to. So, yeah, we're trading off things, and we're looking at that." As for a possibility of a full-time reunion, Oliva stated that he would "love" to do it, adding that "it's very possible": "If it's gonna happen, we'll make an official announcement, but we have been working together, just because with the pandemic and all that, we're bored; there's nothing to do. So we've been trading ideas through e-mails and on the phone. Me and Al wrote three or four things together. Me and Chris Caffery have worked on a few things together. What else are we gonna do? There's nothing to do. So, yeah, we'll see what happens." In June 2021, Oliva reiterated that he has enough material for three new Savatage albums and all the band members "would all love" to work on new material, but added that "there's no deal with a record company to do it" and there are currently no plans to go into the studio.

In a December 2021, Caffery offered an update on new possible music from Savatage to That Metal Interview: "We've been writing and talking about it now. It's the first time in a long time where I actually have been trading riffs and songs with Jon over the phone, and I have some really cool things. I have this one song that I wrote that he really likes and it's kind of one that I think would be a good lead-off track for Savatage. [We're] just calling it 'The Dungeous Are Calling Again' and it's a really, really, really cool metal song. We'll see what happens. I know a lot of people would like to see a new Savatage record. I think the cards are lining up. Whether or not it's gonna fall into place, we'll find out. I always tend to stay really positive and optimistic about it — I have for 20 years. So hopefully it does wind up happening. We're not getting any younger."

Musical style 

Savatage and its former variations started out as a heavy metal band, incorporating Jon Oliva's powerful, sometimes screamed vocals accompanied by Criss Oliva's heavy guitar riffs and fast, melodic solos. When bassist Johnny Lee Middleton joined in 1986, the band took a step in the direction of radio-friendly hardrock due to label pressure, but to no success.

In 1987, producer Paul O'Neill was brought in and added symphonic elements to the band's sound, making Hall of the Mountain King the band's first progressive metal album. Around this time, vocalist Jon Oliva also started focusing more on keyboards and piano. The band's 1991 effort Streets: A Rock Opera was, as its name implies, a rock opera, the first of many to follow.

After the departure of lead vocalist Jon Oliva, his replacement Zachary Stevens brought in a very different vocal sound. The band continued on the progressive metal/hard rock path, and when Jon Oliva rejoined the band, albums would often feature a few songs with him on lead vocals.

One of the band's trademarks, especially in the band's later years, were the counterpoint and harmony vocals. In Savatage's early years, guitarist Criss Oliva would sometimes provide backing vocals, but this decreased dramatically over the years so he could focus on guitar playing. The band's 1994 album Handful of Rain saw the introduction of counterpoint vocals with the song "Chance", and the subsequent albums had some of these incorporated as well. In the studio, Stevens' vocals would be layered on top of each other, but live Jon Oliva, Chris Caffery, Al Pitrelli and Johnny Lee Middleton would all also perform vocals.

Savatage's main influences include Iron Maiden, Judas Priest, Led Zeppelin, Black Sabbath, Deep Purple, AC/DC, Van Halen, Rainbow, UFO, The Beatles,   Rush, The Who, Metallica, Pink Floyd, Queen, Motörhead, Scorpions, Accept, Saxon and Jethro Tull.

In popular culture 
The song "Hall of the Mountain King" from the album of the same name was used in the video game Brütal Legend.

Gutter Ballet was an unpublished Broadway project Paul O'Neill wrote back in 1979. In 1989, Savatage already used this title for their previous album but decided to focus their next release, Streets: A Rock Opera, on it. Trans-Siberian Orchestra reprised, in recent years, the idea to release a Gutter Ballet musical close to O'Neill original script featuring Savatage's music as well.

German power metal band Powerwolf covered "Edge of Thorns" on their 2015 Blessed & Possessed deluxe edition.

The song "Christmas Eve (Sarajevo 12/24)" from the album Dead Winter Dead was used in The Office in season 8 episode 10 "Christmas Wishes".

Band members 

Current members
 Jon Oliva – lead vocals (1978–1992, 2001–2002, 2014-present), keyboards (1981–1992, 1993, 1994—2002, 2014-present), rhythm guitar (1994), bass (1978, 1994), drums (1981, 1991, 1994)
 Johnny Lee Middleton – bass guitar, backing vocals (1986–2002, 2014–present)
 Chris Caffery – guitar, backing vocals (1987–1988, 1989–1990, 1995–2002, 2014–present), keyboards (1987–1988, 1989–1990)
 Zachary Stevens – lead vocals (1992–2000, 2014–present)
 Jeff Plate – drums (1994–2002, 2014–present)
 Al Pitrelli – guitar, backing vocals (1995–1999, 2002, 2014–present)

Timeline

Discography 

 Sirens (1983)
 Power of the Night (1985)
 Fight for the Rock (1986)
 Hall of the Mountain King (1987)
 Gutter Ballet (1989)
 Streets: A Rock Opera (1991)
 Edge of Thorns (1993)
 Handful of Rain (1994)
 Dead Winter Dead (1995)
 The Wake of Magellan (1997)
 Poets and Madmen (2001)

References

External links 
 Official website
 
 

 
American power metal musical groups
American progressive metal musical groups
American symphonic metal musical groups
Articles which contain graphical timelines
Atlantic Records artists
Heavy metal musical groups from Florida
Musical groups established in 1979
Musical groups disestablished in 2002
Musical groups reestablished in 2014
Nuclear Blast artists